Hopea thorelii is a species of plant in the family Dipterocarpaceae. The species is named after the French botanist Clovis Thorel. It is found in Laos and Thailand.

References

thorelii
Flora of Laos
Flora of Thailand
Taxonomy articles created by Polbot